Wallace Charles Bosco (31 January 1880 in St Pancras, London – 1973 in Richmond upon Thames, Surrey) was an English film actor and screenwriter.

Filmography

References

External links

1880 births
1973 deaths
English male film actors
English male silent film actors
People from St Pancras, London
Male actors from London
20th-century English male actors